Bury the Dead (1936) is an expressionist and anti-war drama by the American playwright Irwin Shaw. It dramatizes the refusal of six dead soldiers during an unspecified war—who represent a cross-section of American society—to be buried. Each rises from  a mass nameless grave to express his anguish, the futility of war, and his refusal to become part of the "glorious past".  First the Captain and the Generals tell them it is their duty to be buried, but they refuse.  Even a Priest and a Rabbi try to convince them to no avail. Newspapers refuse to print the story in fear it will hurt the war effort. Finally they bring in the women who have survived them, wives, sister and even mother. None succeed in the end. It was first staged in New York City in 1936 to great acclaim.

Characters
Private Driscoll
Private Morgan
Private Levy
Private Webster
Private Schelling
Private Dean
Joan Burke
Bess Schelling
Martha Webster
Julia Blake
Katherine Driscoll
Elizabeth Dean
Three Generals
Captain
Sergeant
Four Soldiers on Burial Detail
Priest
Rabbi
Doctor
Reporter
Editor
Two Whores
Three Business Men'

See also
List of plays with anti-war themes

External links
 

1936 plays
Anti-war plays
Broadway plays
Expressionist plays
Plays by Irwin Shaw